(The) Chosen Few may refer to:

In Music
Boy Wonder "Chosen Few", Dominican American musician, producer and filmmaker

Bands
The Chosen Few (reggae group), a Jamaican group 
The Chosen Few, a 1960s rock group from Newcastle, England who evolved into Skip Bifferty
The Chosen Few (garage rock band), a 1960s Detroit band, whose members included Ron Asheton
The Chosen Few, a US hardcore punk band formed by members of U.S. Chaos
The Chosen Few (1970s Australian band), a punk band which formed in 1978
The Chosen Few (1980's Australian Band), a rock band active between 1985 and 1992
Chosen Few, Dutch Hardcore DJs / producers team that released gabber classic, "Name Of The DJ"
The Chosen Few, the band of English singer/songwriter Paul Bonin
The Chosen Few, the former name of the Faith Band
Wigan's Chosen Few, credited with the 1975 UK hit "Footsee"

Recordings
The Chosen Few (The Dooleys album), 1979, and the title track
The Chosen Few (Boot Camp Clik album), 2002
The Chosen Few (Judas Priest album),  2011
The Chosen Few, a solo album by blues guitarist Mark Flanagan
"The Chosen Few", a song by the Dropkick Murphys
"Chosen Few" (song), a single by German thrash metal group Kreator
"...A Chosen Few," a song on the Electric Wizard album Let Us Prey
"The Chosen Few" (Electric Wizard song), on the album Witchcult Today

Other
 "The Chosen Few", a 2002 episode of the television series Third Watch
 The Chosen Few MC, a name for a number of outlaw motorcycle clubs
 The Chosen Few (book), The Chosen Few: How Education Shaped Jewish History, 70-1492, 2012, Princeton University Press
 The Chosin Few, American veterans of the Battle of Chosin Reservoir of the Korean War

See also
The Chosen One (disambiguation)